Sarika (born 1960) is an Indian actress.

Sarika may also refer to:

 Sarika, a genus of snails in the family Ariophantidae
 Sarika Sadan, a writer's house museum in Surat, Gujarat, India
 Typhoon Sarika (disambiguation)

People with the given name
 Sarika Devendra Singh Baghel (born 1980), Indian politician
 Sarika Koli (born 1994), Indian cricketer
 Sarika Prasad (born 1959), Singaporean international cricket umpire
 Sarika Sabrin, Bangladeshi actress and model
 Sarika Singh (disambiguation)
 Sarika Yehoshua (born 1927), former Greek-Israeli resistance member

See also
 
 Sarıkaya (disambiguation)